The 2018–19 season is R&F's 3rd season in the top-tier division in Hong Kong football. R&F will compete in the Premier League, Senior Challenge Shield, FA Cup and Sapling Cup in this season.

Coaching staff
{|class="wikitable"
|-
!Position
!Staff
|-
|Head coach|| Yeung Ching Kwong
|-
|Team leader||rowspan="2"| Wu Weian
|-
|Assistant coach
|-
|Assistant coach|| Mirko Renic
|-
|Goalkeeping coach|| Andy McNeil
|-
|Team physician|| Liu Yihao
|-
|Physiotherapist|| Liu Zhixing

Squad

Summer
As of 5 October 2018

 LP

 FP
 LP

 FP

Remarks:
LP These players are considered as local players in Hong Kong domestic football competitions.
FP These players are registered as foreign players.

Winter
As of 16 February 2019

 LP

 FP

 FP
 LP

 FP

Remarks:
LP These players are considered as local players in Hong Kong domestic football competitions.
FP These players are registered as foreign players.

Transfers

In

Summer

Winter

Out

Summer

Winter

Pre-season and friendlies

Training matches

Competitions

Hong Kong Premier League

Table

Results by round

Results summary

League Matches

Hong Kong FA Cup

Hong Kong Senior Challenge Shield

Hong Kong Sapling Cup

Statistics

Appearances and goals

Goalscorers

Assists

Disciplinary record

References 

R&F (HK) seasons
Hong Kong football clubs 2018–19 season